Quebec West was a federal electoral district in Quebec, Canada, that was represented in the House of Commons of Canada from 1867 to 1935, and from 1949 to 1968.

It was created by the British North America Act, 1867. It was abolished in 1933 when it was redistributed into Portneuf, Quebec West and South and Québec—Montmorency ridings.

The riding was recreated in 1947 from parts of Quebec West and South riding.

It was abolished in 1966 when it was redistributed into Langelier, Louis-Hébert and Portneuf ridings.

Members of Parliament

This riding elected the following Members of Parliament:

Election results

Quebec West, 1867–1935

Quebec West, 1949–1968

See also 

 List of Canadian federal electoral districts
 Past Canadian electoral districts

External links 

Riding history from the Library of Parliament:
(1867–1933)
(1947–1966)

Former federal electoral districts of Quebec